Lubomin  (German Liebersdorf) is a village in the administrative district of Gmina Stare Bogaczowice, within Wałbrzych County, Lower Silesian Voivodeship, in south-western Poland.

Galerie

References

Lubomin